Mississippi's 5th congressional district existed from 1855 to 2003. The state was granted a fifth representative by Congress following the 1850 census.

From 1853 to 1855, the fifth representative was elected at-large instead of by district, favoring majority voters. The district was abolished by the state legislature following the 2000 census, when the state lost a seat.

Boundaries
Although the boundaries of the fifth congressional district were altered after every census, it covered the Gulf Coast region and most of the Pine Belt region in southeastern Mississippi from 1993 to 2003.

It included all of Forrest, George, Greene, Hancock, Harrison, Jackson, Lamar, Pearl River, Perry, and Stone counties as well as a portion of Wayne County.

After it was abolished, most of the fifth district was absorbed by the state's fourth congressional district.

2000 election
The district's last election took place on November 7, 2000. Incumbent Gene Taylor, who had represented the district since a special election in 1989, easily won re-election.

List of members representing the district

References

 Congressional Biographical Directory of the United States 1774–present

05
Former congressional districts of the United States
Constituencies established in 1858
1858 establishments in Mississippi
Constituencies disestablished in 2003
2003 disestablishments in Mississippi